Newberry High School is a four-year public high school in Newberry County, South Carolina. Less than 2,000 students attend the high school.

Sports 

Newberry High School has a wide array of sports that compete in SCHSL AAA division which include:

Fall Sports:
V. Football (which experienced success in 2006, winning the 2A upperstate championship),
J.V. Football,
V. Volleyball,
J.V. Volleyball,
Girls Tennis,
Swimming,
V. Cheerleaders,
J.V. Cheerleaders, and
Training Staff.

Winter:
V. Boys Basketball (who won the AA upper state championships in 2012 and 2013, but won the state title in 2014).
V. Girls Basketball, (who lost the upper-state championships (2014–16), lost the state title in 2017, but won the 3A title in 2018).
J.V. Boys Basketball,
J.V. Girls Basketball,
"B" Team Boys Basketball,
Hayden

Wrestling,
V. Cheerleaders, and
J.V. Cheerleaders.

Spring:
V. Baseball,
J.V. Baseball,
V. Softball,
J.V. Softball,
J.V. Boys Soccer,
V. Boys Soccer,
V. Girls Soccer,
Boys Tennis 
Track,
Golf, and
Weightlifting.

Quamel Brown has the highest track time with 10.44 seconds which is the best in the school's history.

Notable alumni 
 Greg Hartle, former NFL player
 Junior Glymph, former NFL player
 Willie Scott, former NFL player

References

External links 
 Newberry High School Athlectics

Public high schools in South Carolina
Newberry, South Carolina
Schools in Newberry County, South Carolina